Ricardo Alberto Zielinski (born 14 October 1959) is an Argentine football manager and former player who played as a midfielder. He is the current manager of Uruguayan club Nacional.

Career
"El Ruso" started his playing career at San Telmo in 1979. Zielinski also played for Argentino de Quilmes, Chacarita Juniors, Deportivo Mandiyú, Deportivo Laferrere and Ituzaingó.

He started his managerial career in 1994 as coach of his former club, Ituzaingó. From 15 December 2010 to 30 July 2016, Zielinski was the manager of Belgrano. In his first season, he got Belgrano promoted to the Primera Division through the play-offs, defeating River Plate 3–1 on aggregate to relegate them for the first time in their history. On 29 August 2016, Zielinski signed with Racing Club.

After leaving Racing, Zielinski was in charge of Atlético Tucumán and Estudiantes de La Plata. On 17 November 2022, he was appointed as manager of Uruguayan side Nacional.

Personal life
Born in Argentina, Zielinski is of Polish descent.

References

External links

1959 births
Living people
Argentine people of Polish descent
Footballers from Buenos Aires
Argentine footballers
Association football midfielders
Argentine Primera División players
San Telmo footballers
Argentino de Quilmes players
Chacarita Juniors footballers
Deportivo Mandiyú footballers
Deportivo Laferrere footballers
Club Atlético Ituzaingó players
Argentine football managers
San Martín de San Juan managers
Defensa y Justicia managers
Club Atlético Belgrano managers
Club Atlético Patronato managers
Club Nacional de Football managers
Argentine expatriate football managers
Argentine expatriate sportspeople in Uruguay
Expatriate football managers in Uruguay